Oleg Stefan  né Oleg Stepanovich Shtefanko (born September 7, 1959) is a Soviet and Russian actor who became popular in Russia after moving there to study acting. He later became an American film actor after emigrating to the United States.

Biography
He studied acting in Moscow, graduated in 1980, then became a member of Moscow Maly Theater. He starred in several Soviet movies until the collapse of the Soviet Union in 1991.

In 1992, Oleg Stefan emigrated to the United States. There he has appeared in a number of popular television series, including Frasier and JAG. He also had a role in Robert De Niro's The Good Shepherd opposite Matt Damon.

After 2003, Oleg Stefan came back to the Russian entertainment industry appearing in leading and supporting roles in several movies made in Moscow.

In 2005 he received a nomination for Gold Nymph Award as Best Actor at the 45th International Festival of Television Films in Monte Carlo.

Filmography

References

External links

1959 births
People from Torez
Living people
Soviet male film actors
Soviet male television actors
Soviet emigrants to the United States
American male film actors
American male television actors
Russian male film actors
Russian male television actors